Iván Ramiro Sosa Cuervo (born 31 October 1997) is a Colombian cyclist, who currently rides for UCI WorldTeam .

Career

Early life and amateur career
Sosa was born into a farming family in Pasca, Cundinamarca, a town located at high altitude in the Colombian Andes, near the capital Bogotá. His father, who is a cycling fan, chose the name Iván for his son after Iván Parra, a Colombian cyclist whom he admired. He is the cousin of professional cyclist Jhojan García,  and a close friend of fellow Colombian cyclist Egan Bernal. He left Colombia for Europe in early 2016 to race for the amateur team Maltinti Lampadari-Banca di Cambiano, and settled in Empoli, Italy. His first win for the team came in June, in the 79th edition of the Schio-Ossario del Pasubio race.

Androni Giocattoli–Sidermec
In 2016, Sosa signed a two-year contract with Italian Professional Continental team  beginning with the 2017 season.

In January 2018, he took his first victory as a professional by winning the 4th stage of the Vuelta al Táchira. His real breakthrough came the following month though, when he finished an impressing 6th overall in the inaugural edition of the Colombian stage race Colombia Oro y Paz. In April, he was part of the team's line-up for the Tour of the Alps and wore the overall leader's jersey after finishing 3rd on the first two mountain stages, ahead of riders such as Chris Froome, Thibaut Pinot and Fabio Aru, but lost his leader's jersey after a crash during a descent on the third stage involving a race motorcycle.

Sosa was not a part of the team's planned line-up for the Giro d'Italia, and team manager Gianni Savio stated that Sosa's impressing performance at the Tour of the Alps had not made him reconsidering his decision, despite Sosa "perhaps wanting to take part in the Giro". He explained his decision by saying his philosophy is to discover talents and let them develop little by little, continuing "It's one thing to ride a race such as the Tour of the Alps with great champions like Froome and Aru, but it has just five racing days and the stages are only short. It's another thing to throw a young 20-year-old rider with no international experience into a three week race such as the Giro d'Italia with stages of over 200 km". Instead he was part of the team's squad at the Tour of Bihor, a Romanian stage race, in early June, where he won the overall classification as well as one stage. Later the same month, he won the overall classification at the inaugural Adriatica Ionica Race, an Italian stage race, as well as one stage.

World Tour contract dispute
However after an initial press release from the team, as well as a video published from Sosa, a dispute between Alberati Fondriest Cycling Academy (Sosa's initial representation) and well-connected rider agent Giuseppe Acquadro occurred. Acquadro took over representation of Sosa, informing Trek that he would not be riding for the team.

Team Sky
In May 2019, he was named in the startlist for the 2019 Giro d'Italia. In October 2020, he was named in the startlist for the 2020 Vuelta a España.

Major results

2016
 1st Schio-Ossario del Pasubio
2017
 3rd Overall Tour of Bihor
1st  Young rider classification
 7th Overall Vuelta al Táchira
1st  Young rider classification
2018
 1st  Overall Vuelta a Burgos
1st  Mountains classification
1st  Young rider classification
1st Stage 5
 1st  Overall Adriatica Ionica Race
1st  Young rider classification
1st Stage 3
 1st  Overall Sibiu Cycling Tour
1st  Points classification
1st  Mountains classification
1st  Young rider classification
1st Stage 1
 1st  Overall Tour of Bihor
1st  Young rider classification
1st Stage 2a
 1st Stage 4 Vuelta al Táchira
 6th Overall Tour de l'Avenir
1st Stage 7
 6th Overall Colombia Oro y Paz
 10th Overall Vuelta al Táchira
1st Stage 4
2019
 1st  Overall Vuelta a Burgos
1st  Mountains classification
1st  Young rider classification
1st Stage 3 & 5
 2nd Overall Route d'Occitanie
1st  Young rider classification
1st Stage 3
 2nd Overall Tour Colombia
1st  Mountains classification
 2nd Gran Piemonte
2020
 1st Stage 5 Vuelta a Burgos
2021
 1st  Overall Tour de la Provence
1st  Young rider classification
1st Stage 3
2022
 1st  Overall Tour de Langkawi
1st Stage 3
 1st  Overall Vuelta a Asturias
1st Stage 2
 5th Overall O Gran Camiño
1st  Mountains classification
 9th Overall Deutschland Tour
 10th Overall Vuelta a Andalucía

Grand Tour general classification results timeline

References

External links

1997 births
Living people
Colombian male cyclists
People from Cundinamarca Department